El Salto may refer to:

El Salto, Durango, a town in Mexico
Roman Catholic Territorial Prelature of El Salto
El Salto, Jalisco, a town in Mexico
El Salto (climbing area), in the state of Nuevo León, Mexico
El Salto Formation, Nicaragua, a geologic formation
El Salto (newspaper), a Spanish alternative newspaper
El Salto Airport, in the Maule Region of Chile
El Salto Dam, El Carpio, Córdoba, Spain

See also
El Salto del Hanabanilla, a village in Villa Clara Province, Cuba
Salto (disambiguation)